The Reims Manège and Circus were built in 1865 and 1867 respectively over designs by architect Narcisse Brunette, in Reims, France. The circus was one of many circuses built in France following "the model that Hittorff perfected in Paris."

Both buildings are monuments historiques of France.

References

External links

 Le Manège et le Cirque 

Buildings and structures in Reims
Circuses